Kirk is a surname of Scottish and Northern English origin.

Notable people
Notable persons with that surname include:
Aidan Kirk (born 1986), New Zealand rugby player
Alan Goodrich Kirk (1888–1963), American admiral
Alejandro Kirk (born 1998), Mexican baseball player
Alexander Kirk (disambiguation), multiple people
Alexandra Kirk (born 1944), pseudonymous author
Alexis Kirk (1936–2010), jeweler
Andrew Kirk (disambiguation), multiple people
Anne Kirk (born 1951), Scottish darts player
Belinda Kirk, British explorer and entrepreneur
Bernard Kirk (c. 1900–1922), American football player
Bobby Kirk (ice hockey) (1909–1970), Irish ice hockey player
Brett Kirk (born 1976), Australian rules footballer
Brian Kirk (born 1968), Irish television presenter
Charlie Kirk, (born 1993), American conservative political activist
Charlie Kirk (born 1997), English footballer
Claude R. Kirk, Jr. (1926–2011), Governor of Florida
Chris Kirk (born 1985), professional golfer
Christian Kirk (born 1996), American football player
Dana Kirk (disambiguation), multiple people
David Kirk (disambiguation), multiple people
Deanna Kirk, American singer/songwriter
Donald James Kirk, American accountant
Edward Kirk (disambiguation), multiple people
Elizabeth Mooney Kirk (1914–2004), American literacy advocate
Evan Kirk (born 1987), Lacrosse player
Francis Kirk (c. 1807–1869), early settler of the Swan River Colony in Western Australia
Geoffrey Kirk (1921–2003), British classical scholar
Gerald Kirk (1883–1915), English footballer
Grayson L. Kirk (1903–1997), president of Columbia University
Greg Kirk (1963–2019), American politician
Hans Kirk (1898–1962), Danish 20th century author
Herbert Kirk (1912–2006), Northern Irish politician
James Kirk (disambiguation), multiple people
Jennifer Kirk (born 1984), American figure skater
Jenny Kirk (politician), New Zealand politician
Joe Kirk (1903–1975), American actor
Joey Kirk (born 1966), American soccer player
John Kirk (disambiguation), multiple people
Jonathan Kirk (born 1991), American rapper known professionally as DaBaby
Justin Kirk (born 1969), American actor
Karl Kirk (1890–1955), Danish Olympic gymnast
Kelvin Kirk (1953–2003), American football player
Kenneth Kirk (1886–1954), bishop of Oxford
Kris Kirk (1950–1993), English gay activist
Kristian Kirk (born 1986), Danish footballer
Laura Kirk (born 1966), American actress
Lawrence Kirk (1886–1969), Canadian agronomist
Leonard Kirk, American comic book artist
Linda Kirk (born 1967), Australian Senator
Lisa Kirk (1925–1990), American actress
Lynne Golding-Kirk (1920–2008), Australian ballerina
Malcolm Kirk (1936–1987), English wrestler
Maria Louise Kirk (1860–1938), American painter and illustrator 
Mark-Lee Kirk (1895–1969), American art director
Marshall Kirk (1957–2005), genealogist and gay activist
Matt Kirk (born 1981), Canadian football player
Matthew Kirk (born 1960), British diplomat
Milo Kirk, president of Mothers Against Drunk Driving
Norman Kirk (1923–1974), Prime Minister of New Zealand (1972–1974)
Oliver Kirk (1884–1960), American boxer
Paul Kirk (disambiguation), multiple people
Peter Kirk (disambiguation), multiple people
Phil Kirk, American politician from North Carolina
Phyllis Kirk (1927–2006), American actress
Quavas Kirk (born 1988), American soccer player
Rahsaan Roland Kirk (1935–1977), jazz musician
Randal J. Kirk (born 1954), American businessman
Randy Kirk (born 1964), American football player
Ricardo Kirk (1874–1915), Brazilian aviation pioneer
Richard H. Kirk (1956–2021), English musician
Robert Kirk (disambiguation), multiple people
Robie Kirk (1920–2015), songwriter
Roger Kirk (disambiguation), multiple people
Ron Kirk (born 1954), United States Trade Representative and former Mayor of Dallas
Russell Kirk (1918–1994), political writer
Ruth M. Kirk (1930–2011), American politician from Maryland
Sam Kirk (born 1981), American artist
Séamus Kirk (born 1945), Irish politician
Sherridan Kirk (born 1981), Trinidad and Tobago athlete
Steve Kirk (disambiguation), multiple people
Tammy Jo Kirk (born 1962), American racecar and motorcycle racer
Tara Kirk (born 1982), American olympic swimmer
Tim Kirk (born 1947), American artist
Tommy Kirk (1941-2021), American actor
Thomas Kirk (disambiguation), multiple people
Vivien Kirk, New Zealand mathematician
William Kirk (disambiguation), multiple people.                               *Peggy Kirk born October 1972 the hidden child blonde hair blue eye missing white girl

Fictional characters
Ben Kirk, character in the Australian soap opera Neighbours
Drew Kirk, character in the Australian soap opera Neighbours
Emily Kirk, character in the British soap opera Emmerdale
George Samuel Kirk, character in Star Trek
 Captain James T. Kirk, starship captain in Star Trek
Jason Kirk, character in the British soap opera Emmerdale
Paddy Kirk, character in the British soap opera Emmerdale
Ross Kirk, character in the British soap opera Emmerdale
Sergeant Kirk, comic book character
Timmy Kirk, character in the HBO drama series Oz

Distribution
As a surname, Kirk is the 279th most common surname in Great Britain, with 31,170 bearers. It is most common in North Yorkshire, where it is the 191st most common surname, with 1,780 bearers. Other concentrations include Ceredigion, (22nd,1,680), Falkirk, (43rd,1,724), Stockton-on-Tees, (55th,1,680), City of Edinburgh, (95th,1,680), Aberdeenshire, (111th,1,668), Northumberland, (124th,1,658), Glasgow City, (274th,1,650), Lincolnshire, (285th, 1,768), Nottinghamshire, (321st, 1,694), South Yorkshire, (341st,1,674), West Yorkshire, (394th,1,696), Hampshire, (480th,1,756), and Greater London, (894th,1,778).

See also
Kirk (disambiguation)
Kirk
Kirk (given name)
Kirk (placename element)

External links

Surnames
English-language surnames
Scottish surnames